Events from the year 1251 in Ireland.

Incumbent
Lord: Henry III

Events

Saint Canice's Cathedral built in Kilkenny.
Fínghin Mac Carthaigh becomes King of Desmond

Births

Deaths

References

 
1250s in Ireland
Ireland
Years of the 13th century in Ireland